"Night Diver" is the second single by Japanese actor and singer Haruma Miura, released posthumously following his death on July 18, 2020. The song was released digitally via A-Sketch on July 24, 2020 and physically on August 26, 2020. The song debuted at number two on the Oricon Weekly Singles Chart, earning him his first top three single.

Track listing

Charts

Weekly charts

Year-end charts

Release history

References

2020 singles
2020 songs
Songs released posthumously
A-Sketch singles